The Durango night lizard (Xantusia extorris) is a diminutive lizard found in the Mexican state of Durango. It is usually found in niches of agave and yucca plants.

References

External links
 Photo of Durango Night Lizard

Xantusia
Reptiles of Mexico
Reptiles described in 1965
Taxa named by Robert G. Webb